Barnjournalen is a children's news show which was broadcast between 3 August 1972 and 1991 on SVT.

References

Swedish television shows